Islam is an Abrahamic religion founded in the Arabian Peninsula, while Sikhism is a monotheistic religion founded in the Punjab region of the Indian subcontinent. Islam means  'submission to God'. The word Sikh is derived from a word meaning 'disciple', or one who learns.

Sikhs believe that the 'creator and creation are one and the same thing', Muslims on the other hand, disagree. Muslims believe God and his attributes are separate from creation and he is not like the creation in any way whatsoever. Muslims believe God exists without a place. Islam believes that Muhammad was the last prophet, to whom the Quran was revealed by God in the 7th century CE. Sikhism was founded in the 15th century CE by Guru Nanak. Guru Granth Sahib is the scripture followed by Sikhs as "The Living Guru".

In Islam, the legal system based on the Quran and the Sunnah is known as Sharia; there is no such legal system mentioned in Guru Granth Sahib. Daily prayers are one of the pillars of Islam, and they are mandatory for all Muslims. Baptized Sikhs read the five banis as part of their daily routine, Nitnem. Islam requires annual zakah (alms giving) by Muslims. Kirat Karna (doing an honest livelihood — earning honestly without any sort of corruption); Naam Japna (to chant and meditate on Naam, read and follow "The One"); and Vand Chhako (selfless service [sewa] and sharing with others) are fundamental to Sikhism given by Guru Nanak Dev Ji. Pilgrimage (to Mecca) is an important part of Islam, while Sikhs make pilgrimage to Sri Harmandir Sahib in Amritsar.

There has been a history of constructive influence and conflict between Islam and Sikhism. The Sikh scripture Guru Granth Sahib includes teachings from Muslims, namely saints (Baba Farid), a Muslim of the Chishti Sufi order and Kabir.

The very first convert to Sikhism was a Muslim,  Bhai Mardana ji, who was Guru Nanak's lifelong friend and companion on his Udasis ( journeys). He used to play Rabab while Guru Nanak composed or sang sacred verses.

The first major interaction between the two religions happened when Guru Nanak spent two years in Mecca and the Middle East. He learned about Islam and had detailed discussions with Muslim priests.

Comparison

Belief

God 
Sikhism believes that God is formless (nirankar). It is a monotheistic religion in that it believe in a single God (Waheguru), and it has also been seen as a form of panentheism. God in the nirgun aspect is without attributes, unmanifest, not seen, but all pervading and permeating, omnipresent. God in the sargun aspect is manifest has attributes, qualities, and seen in the whole creation.

Islam is also a monotheistic religion as Muslims believe one God (Allah) and particularly in the concept of tawḥīd. This Islamic doctrine is a part of its Shahada.

The Islamic theosophical belief in wahdatul wujud has many similarities to Sikh panentheism

Guru and Messengers

Sikhism reveres Guru Nanak as the founder of the religion who taught of the One Divine Creator, Lord on Earth, which is manifest in the ten forms of the ten Gurus of Sikhs. Sikhism accepts that there were divine messengers—including Moses, Jesus, and Mohammed—in other religions.

Islam believes that there were many messengers of God, with the last messenger being Prophet Mohammed, who received the Quran as the last revelation of God. This conflicts with Sikhism whose first guru came around 800 years after the Prophet Mohammed.

Duties/articles of faith 
The three duties of Sikhs are Naam japna (meditating on Waheguru's name), kirat karni (earn honest living), and vand chakna (sharing one's earning with others). Baptized Sikhs, the Amritdhari, belong to the Khalsa Panth and wear the 5 articles of faith, known as the Five Ks:

 Kes — uncut hair and beard;
 Kangha — a wooden comb;
 Kara — a bracelet worn around the wrist;
 Kirpan — a small dagger; and 
 Kachera — a special undergarment.

The Khalsa Panth was created on Vaisakhi in 1699 by the tenth Sikh Guru, Guru Gobind Singh. The Amritdhari have a set of seven Sikh prayers, called Nitnem, which they are required to practise on a daily basis.

The Five Pillars of Islam are duties incumbent on every Muslim:

 Shahada — testimony that "There is no god but Allah and Muhammad is the messenger of God"
 Salat — prayers;
 Zakat — Giving of alms
 Sawm — Fasting during Ramadan; and
 Hajj — pilgrimage to Mecca).

These 5 practices are essential to Sunni Islam; Shi'a Muslims subscribe to 8 ritual practices which substantially overlap with the five Pillars.

Spirituality
Sikhism has an ambivalent attitude towards miracles and rejects any form of discrimination within and against other religions. Sikhism does not believe in rituals, but is permissive of traditions. Sikhism rejects asceticism and celibacy. The Sikhism founder Guru Nanak adopted the Indic ideas on rebirth, and taught the ideas of reincarnation. Adi Granth of Sikhism recognizes and includes spiritual wisdom from other religions.

Islam considers itself to be a perfect and final religion, and warns against innovation (bid‘ah) to what is revealed in the Quran and the Hadiths. Islam believes in miracles and a final judgment day (Yawm al-Qiyāmah).

Apostasy and view on other religions

Sikhism allows freedom of conscience and choosing one's own path. It teaches that many religious traditions are valid, leading to the same Waheguru, and it rejects that any particular religion has a monopoly regarding absolute truth for all of humanity.

Islam teaches that non-Islamic religious traditions have been distorted by man to suit their desires. Accordingly, apostasy—that is abandonment of Islam by a Muslim and conversion to another religion or atheism—is a religious crime in Islam punishable with death. According to the Hadiths, states John Esposito (2003), leaving Islam is punishable by "beheading, crucifixion or banishment," and sharia (Islamic legal code) traditionally has required death by the sword for an adult sane male who voluntarily leaves Islam. However, adds Esposito (2003), modern thinkers have argued against execution as penalty for apostasy from Islam by invoking Quranic verse 2:257.

Predestination 
Sikhism believes in predestination within God's will, and what one does, speaks and hears falls within that will; one has to simply follow the laid down path per God's hukam.

Islam believes in predestination, or divine preordainment (al-qadā wa l-qadar), wherein God has full knowledge and control over all that occurs. According to Islamic tradition, all that has been decreed by God is written in al-Lawh al-Mahfūz, the 'Preserved Tablet'.

Similarities

Grooming and dress
The Khalsa Panth among Sikhs are guided by the five Ks. They keep their head hair long (kesh) and men wear turbans (head hair cover). They carry a wooden comb, wear an iron bracelet, wear a cotton underwear, and carry a kirpan (steel sword). Non-baptized Sikh women are free to dress as they wish in Sikhism. Sex segregation is not required in public places or Sikh temples by Sikhism.

Muslim males are encouraged to grow their beards and trim the moustache. Men in some Muslim communities wear turban (head cap). Muslim men, as well as women, must dress modestly. Muslim women are required to cover their bodies in public, with some Islamic scholars stating that the Hadiths require covering the face too; it is also highly recommended to cover their hair. Islam encourages gender segregation in public, and Muslim men and women do not usually mix in public places such as mosques. These restrictions are part of Adab.

Circumcision

Sikhism does not require circumcision of either males or females, and criticizes the practice.

In Islam, no verse in the Quran supports male or female circumcision (FGM/C). Male circumcision is a widespread practice and considered mandatory for Muslim males according to Sunnah. Muslim scholars disagree whether any authentic Sunnah in the hadiths supports the practice of female circumcision. The Ijma, or consensus of Muslim scholars, varies by the Islamic jurisprudence (fiqh) on whether circumcision is optional, honorable or obligatory for Muslim male and females. Prominent Islamic scholars have both supported and opposed FGM/C for female Muslims.

Food and fasting
Sikhs are prohibited from eating kutha meat—meat obtained by ritualistic component and a slow death of the animal, as in Islamic halal or Jewish kosher meat. The official Sikh Code of Conduct Sikh Rehat Maryada only forbids the consumption of Kutha meat. Charity meals distributed at a Sikh Gurudwara, called a langar, is only lacto-vegetarian. Some groups of Sikhism disagree with the consumption of meat altogether. In practice, some Sikhs eat meat, while some Sikhs avoid meat. Sikhism encourages temperance and moderation in food, i.e. to neither starve or overeat. Thus, it does not find merit in fasting, which is banned as an austerity, as a ritual, or as a mortification of the body by means of wilful hunger. Sikhs are forbidden from smoking and consumption of tobacco.

Islam has Quranic restrictions on food, such as how the meat is prepared. Halal meat is required in Islam, prepared by ritual slaughter that involves cutting the jugular veins of the animal with a sharp knife. This leads to death, through bleeding, of the animal. Meat from animals that die of natural causes or accident is not allowed, unless necessary. Beef is a religiously acceptable food to Muslims, but pork and alcohol is not.

Fasting is commended in Islam, especially in the month of Ramadan.

Taxation
Sikhism has never required a special tax for non-Sikhs.

Muslim rulers in history compelled the payment of a special tax (jizya) from dhimmi, non-Muslims living in a Muslim state. The Muslim jurists required adult, free, sane males among the dhimmi community to pay the jizya, while exempting non-Muslim women, children, elders, handicapped, the ill, the insane, monks, hermits, slaves and musta'mins—non-Muslim foreigners who only temporarily reside in Muslim lands. Dhimmis who chose to join military service were also exempted from payment, as were those who could not afford to pay. According to Islamic law, non-Muslim elders, handicapped etc. must be given pensions, and they must not go into begging. The purpose of the jizya was in exchange for protection and defending all non-Muslim residents against outside forces or invasions. Jizya was never imposed with the purpose to humiliate, demean or impose the faith of Islam on the non-Muslims. As Muslims pay zakat (2.5% of their savings, this amount of zakat paid by Muslims, exceeded the amount of jizya paid by the non-Muslims), which goes to the government for people in need. Dhimmis were excluded from having to pay Islamic religious tax such as zakat, also were excluded from other Islamic religious obligations.

Worship and pilgrimage

The Golden Temple (Harmandir Sahib) in Amritsar, India is not only a central religious place of the Sikhs, but also a symbol of human brotherhood and equality. The four entrances of the holy shrine from all four directions, signify that people belonging to every walk of life are equally welcome. The Golden Temple is a holy site for Sikhs and is welcome to people of any faith.

Sikhs do not believe in pilgrimages. However, the first Sikh Guru, Baba Guru Nanak, is known to have attended the Hajj on one occasion.

Mecca in Saudi Arabia is the central religious place in Islam. Mecca is regarded as the holiest city in Islam, and a pilgrimage to it (Hajj) is one of the pillars of Islam. Non-Muslims are prohibited from entering the city.

Demography 

Islam is the second largest religion in the world as of 21st century with around 2 billion followers worldwide including Majority of Sunni and minority Shia,and Major School of jurisprudence Hanafi, shafii, Maliki, Hanbali.

Mystical side of Islam includes Sufi and Islamic moments of Indian subcontinent includes Deobandi and Barelvi

While on the other hand, Sikhism is the fifth largest religion in the world as of 21st century with around 180 million followers, including all of its sects, such as Nanakpanthis & Khalsa Sikhs.

History

Sikh Gurus 
During the period of Guru Nanak Dev Ji (the 1st Guru of Sikhism), many people from the lower sections of society joined Sikhi. The main three principles taught by the Guru were, Naam Japna (to remember the one God), Kirat Karni (to live an honourable life), Vand Chakna (to share with others). During this time, although his followers still remained Hindu, Muslim, or of the religion to which they were born, they became known as the Guru ji's disciples, or sikhs. It was here his followers began to refer to him as teacher, or guru. The Guru ji told his followers that they were to be householders and could not live apart from the world—there were to be no priests or hermits. Here is where the Guru ji instituted the common meal, requiring the rich and poor, Hindu and Muslim, high caste and low caste, to sit together while eating. All worked together, all owned the town. Here is where Lehna, later to be Guru Angad, came to be with Guru Nanak Dev ji.

During Muslim Emperor Akbar's rule, Sikhism and other religions were accepted and flourished. The Emperor established an Ibadat Khana, which served as a platform for religious debates and dialogues among different communities, including Sikhs. He also visited Guru Amar Das (3rd Sikh Guru) at Goindwal, where he ate at and offered donations for the Langar.

For most of the Mughal Empire, however, Sikh Gurus were persecuted. Guru Arjan (5th Guru), for instance, was executed by the hands of Chandu Shah. After the martyrdom of Guru Arjan, Guru Hargobind (6th Guru) saw that it would no longer be possible to protect the Sikh community without the aid of arms. He wore two swords of Miri and Piri and built the Akal Takhat, the Throne of the Immortal, which is the highest political institution of the Sikhs. When Kashmiri Pandits were being forcefully converted to Islam by Aurangzeb, Guru Tegh Bahadur (9th Guru) were beheaded for refusing to convert by Aurangzeb at Chandni Chowk in Delhi. Fellow devotees Bhai Mati Das, Bhai Sati Das and Bhai Dayala were also tortured and executed, while Guru Tegh Bahadur were forced to watch.

Guru Gobind Singh (10th Guru) formed the Khalsa—the Army of the Akal Purakh (Immortal) Two of Guru Gobind Singh's younger sons, Sahibzaade Fateh Singh (aged 7) and Zorawar Singh (aged 9), were bricked up alive by Mughal Governor Wazir Khan in Sirhind, Punjab. When in South India, Guru Gobind Singh sent Banda Singh Bahadur to chastise the repressive Governor of Sirhind. Banda Singh captured Sirhind and laid the foundation of the first Sikh empire. The Nawab of Malerkotla, Sher Mohammad Khan, protested against the execution of the Sahibzaade, after which Guru Gobind Singh blessed the state. Many historians consider this as a reason why Malerkotla was the only city not harmed by Banda Singh Bahadur during his military campaign.

Guru Nanak and the Nizari Ismailis 
While there is no consensus on the issue of Guru Nanak’s faith prior to the advent of Sikhism, one largely overlooked theory proposed by Dominique Sila-Khan in her works, Crossing the Threshold: Understanding Religious Identities in South Asia (2004) and Conversions and Shifting Identities (1997), argues that Guru Nanak was neither Hindu nor Sufi Muslim in the ‘mainstream’ sense, but rather, a Nizari Ismaili Muslim prior to Sikhism’s creation.

Panth and Caste 
Cartesian logic and the attempt to rigidly categorize people into religions often fails within the context of South Asia, and certainly did so in the nineteenth century. In fact, while attempting to create an Indian census, British colonists struggled to classify communities. In 1881, a British commissioner stated, “the observances and beliefs which distinguish the followers of the several faiths in their purity are so strangely blended and intermingled that it is often impossible to say that one prevails rather than the other, or to decide in which category the people shall be classified."

In pre-colonial South Asia, religion was thus embraced and practiced as a more fluid phenomenon than how it may have been addressed post-colonialism and within contemporary religio-political landscapes.

Perhaps as a more rigid form of organization, caste was used to categorize and informally legislate communities across South Asia. Not so much as a religious than social form of identification, Muslims also engaged in the caste system by dividing themselves along the lines of jati. This social engagement is demonstrated by Rajput rulers considering themselves of the same jati as Mughals. As such, religion was not so much of a marker of affinity as caste was, and castes could possess multiple religious traditions within themselves.

As an alternative to “religion,” South Asian faiths can be described as panth (path) and insinuate a spiritual mentor-disciple relationship. This panth model of faith often centers a spiritual figure like Kabir or Guru Nanak and proposes “a different path to salvation, through a distinct system of beliefs and practices.” The combination of social and religious categorization is referred to as jat-panth, forming labels around the loose affiliations found along the religious continuum of South Asia.

In an environment with ample religious fluidity and an impulse to delineate caste identity, Dominique Sila-Khan argues that there is a possibility that Guru Nanak was a Nizari Ismaili follower of Pir Shams practicing cautionary dissimulation in his early years. His Katri caste identification and recorded reverence for Pir Shams stands as one of the historical proofs for his Ismaili connection.

Proofs 
Dominique Sila-Khan, using the religious and social context described above, offers evidence for her claim by tracking the similarities of Guru Nanak and Sikhism with the Ismailis.

 Dasondh-Dasvandh 
 The fifth Guru, Arjun, mandated that Sikhs give one-tenth of their income in the name of the Guru just as the Ismailis do for their Imam. The similarity indicates a ritualistic affinity with the Ismailis and conceptualization of alms.
 Dharamsala-Jamatkhana
 Historically, Imamshahi’s would also call their religious spaces Dharamsalas just as early Sikhs would. Additionally, the Sikh sangat has an equivalence in the Ismaili jamat, indicating a similarity in the way in which the traditions conceptualize space and gathering.
 Rituals 
 In the practice of Khande ki Pahul, it is believed by some Sikhs that the first double edged dagger used to mix the water was the zulfiqar of Imam Ali. This call to Shia Islam indicates a spiritual connection that can be contrasted with Guru Nanak’s strong indictments of Sunni ulema. This reverence for the Imamate and contempt for Sunni scholars shows a parallel with the Ismailis.
 Guruship, Pirship, and Imamate 
 While Guru Nanak clearly differentiated himself and God, he is still treated in the ambiguous stage between man and the Divine. In this regard, the status of the Guru is like that of the Pir or of the Imam in the Ismaili tradition. Additionally, the passing of the mantle of Guru being described as a transfer of light echoes the process of nass in the Ismaili tradition by which nur is transferred from the previous Imam to the next Imam. Linguistically, the language of sacha padshah is also used in both Sikh and Ismaili traditions to describe the ‘Supreme Guru’ or ‘True Emperor’ God.
 Nanakshahi’s Hagiography 
 Hagiographies describing Guru Nanak’s life have strong parallels to Ismaili literature. As an example, both Pir Shams Sabzwari and Guru Nanak were said to have gone to a village in which they were told they would be a burden by being given a bowl of milk. In both instances, the figures placed a flower on top of the milk to describe their insignificance upon the village and its resources. It is also recorded that Guru Nanak would bow to the grave of Pir Shams when he encountered it. Taken even further, both figures are attributed with saying a variant of  the lin: “there is no Hindu, there is no Muslim.” In having Guru Nanak mirror Pir Shams, there is a demonstrated connection between the Sikhs and the Ismailis. In fact, some Ismaili ginans even mention Guru Nanak’s relationship with Pir Shams, indicating Ismaili and Sikhi cognizance of each other’s relationship to each other.

Rethinking Guru Nanak 
Dominique Sila-Khan presents a landscape of South Asian religious and caste identities that is full of changing associations and identities to deconstruct discrete categories of religious identity. In doing so, Guru Nanak can be contextualized as a figure who embraced some, and discarded other, forms of Ismaili practice to create his own separate, though not necessarily competing, form of religious thought. Sikhism’s practices and closeness to Ismailis should be taken as two faith traditions being in conversation with each other.

Sikh Rule 
The Muslim religious leadership and mosques continuously received state support under Sikh rule. This was in contrast to the Muslims of Kashmir valley, where Sikh rule was generally oppressive, although Punjab was governed by Maharaja Ranjit Singh and Kashmir was ruled intermittently by either Hindu or Sikh governors. The region had passed from the control of the Durrani Empire of Afghanistan, and four centuries of Muslim rule under the Mughals and the Afghans, to the Sikhs under Ranjit Singh in 1819. As the Kashmiris had suffered under the Afghans, they initially welcomed the new Sikh rulers, however this perception later changed. The Sikh rulers of Kashmir enacted several anti-Muslim laws, which included handing out death sentences for cow slaughter, closing down the Jamia Masjid in Srinagar, and banning the azaan, the public Muslim call to prayer. Several European visitors who visited Kashmir during Sikh rule wrote of the abject poverty of the vast Muslim peasantry and the exorbitant taxes under the Sikh rulers. High taxes, according to some contemporary accounts, had depopulated large tracts of the countryside. However, after a famine in 1832, the Sikhs reduced the land tax.

Sufi Muslims and Sikhs 
In South Asia alone, there are over 200 million Muslims who are followers of Sufi traditions, the most notable being the Barelvi movement. The Sikh Gurus had cordial relations with many Sufi Saints, and in the Sikh holy book, the Guru Granth Sahib, many Sufi and other Muslim scholars’ quotes and wisdom are featured.

In December 1588, a Sufi saint of Lahore, Mian Mir, visited Guru Arjan Dev at the initiation ceremony before the construction of the Harmandir Sahib (Golden Temple).

The Ahmadiyya Movement is a Muslim reform movement founded by Mirza Ghulam Ahmad (regarded as the Masih and Mahdi) to purify, defend, and proselytizing Islam. Since the 18th century, Sufis and ancestors of Mirza Ghulam Ahmad had cordial relations with Sikhs. Soon, however, the Sufis would have to battle the Sikh Ramgarhia. However, as Ranjit Singh established the Sikh Empire, they pledged their loyalty and joined his army. For their service as commanders, Ranjit Singh returned to them some of the lost territory of their Jagir.

Ahmad Sirhindi, a renowned and influential Sufi philosopher of the 16th and 17th centuries, was hostile to the Sikhs and celebrated the execution of the fifth Sikh guru, Guru Arjan. He wrote a laudatory letter to Shaikh Farid Bukhari (Murtza Khan) with an excerpt quoted [sic] as follows:

British India and Partition 
During the British Raj, Sikhs and Punjabi Muslims shared brotherhood, both participating in the British Indian Army to whom they showed loyalty during the revolt of 1857.

During the partition of India in 1947, millions of Sikhs left Pakistan and moved into India, while millions of Muslims left India and moved into Pakistan; in between this movement, there was much bloodshed. As people from all walks of life left their homes and belongings to travel across the new border of India and Pakistan, many were killed on trains and land in what is thought to be acts of revenge. Malerkotla was not affected and was viewed as a safe haven for Muslims during the partition. The popular legend associated with it is that the town was not impacted because of Guru Gobind Singh blessing it after its Nawab protested against the execution of the Guru's sons.

Sikhs, under Master Tara Singh, were promised an autonomous region by Muhammad Ali Jinnah on behalf of the Muslim population, as well as by Jawaharlal Nehru and Mahatma Gandhi, on behalf of the majority Hindu community. They feared that Sikhs would join Pakistan if their support was not secured in backing the partition of Punjab. After the former colonial kingdoms and Princely states were being divided along language differences, Punjab and Sikhs were not given any special status in the Constitution Act of India.

Recent relations 
Since 9/11, Muslims and Sikhs in America have endured hate crimes, denial of employment, bullying in schools, and profiling in airports.

In the UK, there have some instances of tension between Sikhs and Muslims, on  allegations that some Sikhs have been forced to convert to Islam.

In 2009, the Taliban in Pakistan demanded that Sikhs in the region pay them the jizya (poll tax levied by Muslims on non-Muslim minorities). In 2010, the Taliban attacked many minorities including Sikhs resulting in two beheadings.

In April 2016, two 16-year-old Muslims bombed a gurdwara in the German city of Essen using fire extinguishers that were converted into an explosive device. The devices detonated after a wedding party had left for the reception. A gurdwara priest was injured seriously, while two others were treated for minor injuries. The building itself was damaged severely. One of the teens was in deradicalization program. The two denied that it was religiously motivated, saying it was “just for the kick of building fireworks!” However, before setting off the blast, the two tried to break into another gurdwara in North Rhine Westphalia.

See also
 Islam and other religions
 Sikhism
 Ganga Sagar (urn)
 Battle of Chamkaur
 Mughal Empire
 Divisions of the world in Islam

Notes

References

Further reading
Brass, Paul. 2006. "Victims, heroes or martyrs? partition and the problem of memorialization in contemporary Sikh history."
Chopra, R. M. "Sikhism and Islam." In . New Delhi: SANBUN. .
Copland, Ian. 1991. "The Princely States, the Muslim League, and the Partition of India in 1947." The International History Review 13(1):38–69. .
Fenech, Louis. 1997. "Martyrdom and the Sikh tradition." Journal of the American Oriental Society 117(4):623–42.
Smith, M. W. 1948. "Synthesis and Other Processes in Sikhism." American Anthropologist 50(3):457–62.
 Talib, Gurbachan. 1950. Muslim League Attack on Sikhs and Hindus in the Punjab 1947. India: Shiromani Gurdwara Prabandhak Committee. Google Books.
 Trumpp, Ernest, trans. 1877. Adi Granth, or The Holy Scripture of the Sikhs. London: WH Allen & Co.
van der Veer, Peter. 2002. "Religion in South Asia." Annual Review of Anthropology (31):173–87.
 The Qu'ran, University of Southern California

External links

Information center for Sikh Religion, Sikh History, Culture and Science

Sikhism
Sikhism and other religions